Lackamas Creek is a stream in Thurston County in the U.S. state of Washington.  It is a tributary to the Nisqually River.

The name "Lackamas" is derived from that of the native camas plant, a food source of Native Americans. The name sometimes is spelled "Lacamas Creek".

References

Rivers of Thurston County, Washington
Rivers of Washington (state)